Adriano da Silva (born 2 May 1980 in Maringá), known as Adriano Peixe, is a Brazilian footballer, who last played for Assisense.

In February 2009, Adriano joined Standard Sumgayit in the Azerbaijan Premier League on loan.

References

External links

Adriano Peixe at ZeroZero

1980 births
Living people
Brazilian footballers
Mirassol Futebol Clube players
Association football defenders
América Futebol Clube (SP) players
Expatriate footballers in Azerbaijan
América Futebol Clube (RN) players
People from Maringá
Sociedade Esportiva do Gama players
Brazilian expatriate footballers
Clube Atlético Sorocaba players
Brazilian expatriate sportspeople in Azerbaijan
Associação Ferroviária de Esportes players
Botafogo Futebol Clube (PB) players
Association football midfielders
Sportspeople from Paraná (state)